Marine Fighter Attack Squadron 225 (VMFA-225) is a United States Marine Corps  fighter attack squadron flying the F-35B Lightning II. The squadron, known as the "Vikings", is based at Marine Corps Air Station Yuma, Arizona and falls under the command of Marine Aircraft Group 13 (MAG-13) and the 3rd Marine Aircraft Wing (3d MAW).

History

World War II

Marine Fighting Squadron 225 (VMF-225) was commissioned January 1, 1943 at Marine Corps Air Station Mojave, California.  From August 1944 to January 1945, the F4U Corsairs of VMF-225 participated in numerous combat operations in the New Hebrides Islands.

Returning to the United States in February 1945, VMF-225 was eventually stationed at Marine Corps Air Station Cherry Point, North Carolina, with interim basing at MCAAS Mojave, California; MCAS Santa Ana, California; and MCAS Edenton, North Carolina.

Vietnam War
In the early 1960s the squadron had been trained for "special weapons" delivery.  This meant they were certified to deliver nuclear weapons
On June 1, 1965, skyhawks from VMA-225 were the first tactical fixed-wing aircraft to land at Chu Lai Air Base  for participation in combat operations against Viet Cong forces in South Vietnam.  Several hours after landing, Lieutenant Colonel Robert W. Baker, VMA-225 Commanding Officer, lead the first combat mission from the base striking the enemy six miles to the north.

VMA-225 returned to MCAS Cherry Point in October 1965. In April 1966 the Grumman built A-6 Intruder replaced the A-4 Skyhawk as the squadron's combat ready aircraft. With the advent of the Intruder and its all weather capability, the squadron was redesignated VMA(AW)-225. While stationed at MCAS Cherry Point, VMA(AW)-225 provided air support for units of the 2nd Marine Division, Fleet Marine Force, Atlantic. The squadron also deployed several times to MCAS Yuma, Arizona, for live weapons training.

In January 1969, VMA(AW)-225 deployed to Da Nang Air Base, Vietnam. The primary mission of Marine All Weather Attack Squadron 225 was to provide close air support and direct air support for ground elements for allied forces in the I Corp area of South Vietnam. The squadron attacked and destroyed surface targets day and night, and in all weather conditions. A secondary mission was to utilize the Intruder's unique search radar Airborne Moving Target Indicator (AMTI) features in the interdiction of trucks on the Ho Chi Minh Trail in Southeast Asia. During May 1971, VMA(AW)-225 returned to MCAS El Toro, California, and the squadron was deactivated on June 15, 1972.

The Gulf War & the 1990s
The squadron was reactivated on July 1, 1991, at MCAS El Toro, California, and redesignated as Marine All Weather Fighter Attack Squadron 225 (VMFA(AW)-225).

The Global War on Terror
VMFA(AW)-225 was the first Marine Corps fighter squadron deployed to the Middle East in support of Operation Iraqi Freedom.  The squadron was deployed in January 2003 from its home base at MCAS Miramar in San Diego, CA to Ahmed Al Jabar Air Base in Kuwait.  From Kuwait, the "Vikings" took part in Operation Southern Watch, assisting the US Air Force in patrolling the Southern No-Fly-Zone set up by the United Nations in Iraq.  In March 2003, VMFA(AW)-225 began flying combat sorties in support of Operation Iraqi Freedom.  Joining 225 were other members of Marine Aircraft Group 11.VMFA (AW)-225 also deployed in support of OIF in 2007-2008 at Al-Asad Air Base in Iraq.

F-35B Lightning II
The Vikings conducted their final Hornet flight on January 23, 2020 and are to transition to the F-35B Lightning II The unit officially transitioned on January 29, 2021.

Gallery

See also

 List of active United States Marine Corps aircraft squadrons
 United States Marine Corps Aviation
 Organization of the United States Marine Corps

References

Citations

Bibliography

External links

 

Fighter attack squadrons of the United States Marine Corps